The Turkish Air Force is the aerial warfare service branch of the Turkish Armed Forces. The Turkish Air Force can trace its origins back to June 1911, when it was founded as the Ottoman Aviation Squadrons by the Ottoman Empire. However, the Air Force as a separate branch of the Turkish Armed Forces (which previously existed as the Army Aviation Squadrons, founded in 1911; and Naval Aviation Squadrons using seaplanes, founded in 1914) did not come into existence until the establishment of the Republic of Turkey in 1923. It is considered to be the third largest air force in NATO.

In 1998, the Turkish Armed Forces announced a program of modernization worth US$160 billion over a twenty-year period in various projects. $45 billion was earmarked to go to the overhaul of the Turkish Air Force, and includes commissioning new combat aircraft (consisting of multi-role and fifth generation stealth fighters) and helicopters (consisting of heavy lift, attack, medium lift and light general purpose helicopters).

According to Flight International (Flightglobal.com) and the International Institute for Strategic Studies, the Turkish Air Force has an active strength of 50,000 military personnel and operates approximately 1,248 manned aircraft (2020).

The world's first black pilot Ahmet Ali Çelikten and first female fighter pilot Sabiha Gökçen both served in the Turkish Air Force.

History

Initial stages

The history of Ottoman military aviation dates back to between June 1909 and July 1911. In 1911 the former commander of the Action Army Mahmud Sevket Pasa achieved to send some Turkish military officers to the French Bleriot aviation school. The same year the establishment of a Turkish airforce was taken into consideration. During the Italian Turkish war of 1911, the Ottomans had to admit their disadvantage of not possessing an air force. Subsequently the Ottomans employed German and French engineers who helped them to establish an air force with a dozen airplanes. The Ottoman Aviation Squadrons participated in the Balkan Wars (1912–1913) and World War I (1914–1918). The fleet size reached its apex in December 1916, when the Ottoman Aviation Squadrons had 90 active combat aircraft. Some early help for the Ottoman Aviation Squadrons came from the Imperial German Fliegertruppe (known by that name before October 1916), with future Central Powers 13-victory flying ace Hans-Joachim Buddecke flying with the Turks early in World War I as just one example. The General Inspectorate of Air Forces (Kuva-yı Havaiye Müfettiş-i Umumiliği) By July 1918, the Aviation Squadrons were reorganized as the General Inspectorate of Air Forces. 

After the Armistice of Mudros and the occupation of the Ottoman Empire by the Allies in 1919, some Turkish aviators tried to build new units in Istanbul, İzmir, Konya, Elazığ and Diyarbakır with planes left over from World War I and tried to bring together flight personnel. During the Turkish War of Independence, Turkish pilots joined the Konya Air Station (Konya Hava İstasyonu). With the formation of the Grand National Assembly (GNA) by Mustafa Kemal and his colleagues on April 23, 1920, in Ankara, and the reorganization of the army, the Branch of Air Forces (Kuva-yı Havaiye Şubesi) was established under the Office of War (Harbiye Dairesi) of the GNA. A few damaged aircraft belonging to the GNA were repaired, and afterwards used in combat.

In July 1922, it was reorganized as the Inspectorate of Air Forces (Kuva-yı Havaiye Müfettişliği) at Konya.

Inspectorate of Air Forces
  

After the establishment of the Republic of Turkey on 29 October 1923, plans were made to form a modern air force. Originally consisting of three normal and one naval aviation units, and an air school, the number of units was increased to 10 normal and three naval aviation units. Starting in 1924, personnel were sent abroad for flight education. In 1925, the Air School was re-established in Eskişehir and its first students graduated that same year. In the same year, the Air Force was deployed to take part in a campaign aimed to suppress the Sheikh Said rebellion. The Inspectorate of Air Forces was reorganized as the Undersecretariat of the Ministry of Defense in 1928 and new schools were found for non-pilot personnel. Some personnel were sent to the United Kingdom and France for training; others were sent to the United States and Italy in 1930.

From 1932, the air regiments were considered to be a separate combat arm and started training its own personnel. Turkish aviators wore blue uniforms from 1933.

The Air War College (Hava Harp Akademisi) was established in 1937.

Sabiha Gökçen became the first female fighter pilot in military history in 1937. She joined the Turkish Air Force in 1936 and in 1937 took part in the military operation to put down the Dersim Revolt, thus becoming the world's first female air force pilot with battle experience. Throughout her career in the Turkish Air Force, which lasted until 1964, Gökçen flew 22 different types of aircraft for more than 8000 hours, 32 of which were active combat and bombardment missions. She was selected as the only female pilot for the poster of "The 20 Greatest Aviators in History" published by the United States Air Force in 1996.

Air Force Command
By 1940, Turkish air brigades had more than 500 combat aircraft in its inventory, becoming the largest air force in the Balkans and the Middle East. The growing inventory of air brigades required another structural change, which was made in 1940. The Air Undersecretariat under the Ministry of National Defense for logistical affairs and the General Staff for educational affairs were united to form the Air Force Command (Hava Kuvvetleri Komutanlığı) in 1944. Thus, the Air Force became a separate branch of the Turkish Armed Forces. The first Commander of the Turkish Air Force was General Zeki Doğan. Turkey did not enter World War II on the side of the Allies until February 1945. However, the Turkish Armed Forces went on full alert and were prepared for war following the military alliance between neighbouring Bulgaria and the Axis Powers which was formalized in March 1941, and the occupation of neighbouring Greece by the Axis Powers in April 1941. Within a year, Turkey's borders were surrounded by German forces in the northwest and west, and Italian forces in the southwest. The Turkish Air Force made daily reconnaissance flights over Bulgaria, Greece, the Greek Islands in the Aegean Sea, and the Dodecanese Islands which then belonged to Italy, to monitor the positions of the Axis forces. The large cities in western Turkey were darkened at nights, and anti-aircraft guns and searchlights were deployed for defence against possible enemy planes. Almost all available money in the Turkish Government Treasury was used to purchase new weapons from any available provider in the world. The Turkish Air Force received large numbers of new aircraft in this period, including Supermarine Spitfire Mk.I/V/IX/XIX, Curtiss Falcon CW-22R/B, Fairey Battle-I, Avro Anson-I, Hawker Hurricane I/II, Morane-Saulnier M.S.406, Curtiss P-40 Tomahawk, Curtiss P-40 Kittyhawk, Westland Lysander-I, Consolidated B-24D Liberator B-24, Bristol Blenheim IV/V, Bristol Beaufort, Bristol Beaufighter Mk.I/X, Focke-Wulf Fw 190-A3, Martin 187 Baltimore, De Havilland DH.98 Mosquito Mk.III/IV, Douglas B-26B/C Invader, P-47D Thunderbolt and Douglas C-47A/B Dakota.

The Air Machinist School (Hava Makinist Okulu) was reorganized as Aircraft Maintenance School (Hava Uçak Bakım Okulu) on 2 January 1950 to unite schools responsible for training non-pilot Air Force personnel. In 1950 it also was decided to upgrade the Air Force fleet through the inclusion of jets. Eight pilots were sent to the United States for jet pilot training. They graduated in 1951 and started training jet pilots in the Turkish Air Force. In the same year, the 9th Fighter Wing (9uncu Ana Jet Üssü) was founded in Balıkesir as Turkey's first fighter wing; the 191st, 192nd, and 193rd squadrons being the first ones which were established. Further training in the United States followed, usually involving jet manufacturers. In 1951 the Air Force Academy was formed with integrating some air schools in Eskişehir and its first academic year started on 1 October 1951. In 1956 the Hava Eğitim Kolordu Komutanlığı (Air Education Corps Command) was founded and all education was united under this command. The command was renamed as Hava Eğitim Komutanlığı (Air Education Command) in 1957.

Upon Turkey's membership to NATO in 1952, the process of modernization was accelerated. In 1962 the Taktik Hava Kuvveti (Tactical Air Force) was founded by upgrading the Hava Tümeni (Air Division) units to corps-level organizations. 

In 1974 the Air Force was employed in the Cyprus War.  With the arrival of the first batch of 40 third generation F-4E Phantom II fighter jets ordered in 1972 and acquired between 1974 and 1978, the Air Force was reorganized. This was followed by a second order in 1978 of another batch of 40 units (32 F-4Es and 8 RF-4Es, deliveries began in 1980). Another batch of 70 more F-4Es were acquired between 1981 and 1987, and 40 more F-4Es were acquired between 1991 and 1992, as well as 46 more RF-4E reconnaissance aircraft. In total, the Turkish Air Force received 236 F-4 Phantom II (182 F-4E and 54 RF-4E) aircraft. In 1997, IAI was selected to upgrade 54 of Turkey's F-4E fighter aircraft to the F-4E Terminator 2020 standard. The upgraded aircraft were delivered between 1999 and 2003; of these, 26 aircraft were upgraded in Israel and the remaining 28 were upgraded in Turkey.

In 1983 Turkey ordered the fourth-generation F-16 Fighting Falcon fighter aircraft and started receiving them in 1987. The Turkish Air Force has received a total of 270 F-16C/D aircraft in its inventory, all of them Block 30/40/50 models. Turkey is one of five countries that locally produce F-16 fighter jets.

In 1995, the Turkish Air Force took part in NATO's Operation Deliberate Force. 

Turkey provided 18 F-16s for the NATO campaign against Serbia during Operation Allied Force in 1999. Of these, 11 TAI-built F-16s were stationed at the NATO base in Aviano, Italy, while the other 7 were based in Ankara, Turkey. All were equipped with laser-guided bombs using the LANTIRN night vision system. Turkish jets had previously patrolled Balkan airspace, providing protection for attacking aircraft. During this allied air campaign, TAI-built F-16s set a world CAP record by patrolling for 9 hours and 22 minutes above the Balkan theatre. Normally, CAP missions last between 3 and 4 hours.

Turkey participated in the United Nations peacekeeping mission in Bosnia-Herzegovina, employing two squadrons (one in the Ghedi fighter wing, and after 2000 one in the Aviano fighter wing). They returned to Turkey in 2001.

In 2006, 4 Turkish F-16 fighter jets were deployed for NATO's Baltic Air Policing operation.

In December 2007, the Turkish Air Force initiated Operation Northern Iraq, which continued until the end of February 2008, eventually becoming a part of Operation Sun. At the initial phase of this operation, on December 16, 2007, the TuAF used the AGM-65 Maverick and AGM-142 Popeye/Have Nap during a night bombardment for the first time.

In August 2011, the Turkish Air Force launched multiple aerial raids against the PKK in Iraq, striking 132 targets in six days. In 2013, the Turkish Air Force began striking ISIL targets in Syria and Iraq. In July 2015, during Operation Martyr Yalçın, the Turkish Air Force launched air strikes against ISIL and PKK targets in Syria and Iraq.

On 22 June 2012, during the Syrian civil war, a Turkish RF-4E Phantom II reconnaissance aircraft was shot down by a Syrian surface-to-air missile and crashed into the Mediterranean Sea; both the pilot and the navigator lost their lives. On 23 March 2014, a Turkish F-16 shot down a Syrian MiG-23 near the Turkey-Syria border; the Syrian pilot was reported to have safely ejected from the aircraft. On 24 November 2015, a Turkish F-16 shot down a Russian Su-24 strike aircraft which, according to Turkish authorities, had violated Turkish airspace by crossing the Turkey-Syria border. The Russian government contested those claims, stating that the aircraft never entered Turkish airspace. The pilot and navigator both ejected from the aircraft; the navigator was rescued, but the pilot was shot and killed by Syrian rebel ground fire while descending by parachute. The incident sparked a crisis in Turkey's relations with Russia, which were restored in 2016 when Turkish President Erdoğan expressed his regret and condolences to Russian President Putin.

Other important air strikes by the Turkish Air Force in recent years include Operation Euphrates Shield (2016–2017), Operation Olive Branch (2018–2019), Operation Peace Spring (2019), Turkish intervention in Libya (2020), Operation Spring Shield (2020), and Operation Claw Sword (2022).

Turkish Air Force and NATO

The Turkish Air Force contributes personnel and aircraft to the command centers and air bases of NATO and actively participates in the exercises of the alliance in Europe and North America.

The headquarters of NATO's Allied Air Component Command for Southern Europe (formerly designated as AIRSOUTH and originally headquartered in Naples, Italy) was established in İzmir, Turkey, on 11 August 2004. Allied Air Command İzmir was deactivated on 1 June 2013, when the Allied Air Command (AIRCOM) at the Ramstein Air Base in Germany became the sole Allied Air Component Command of NATO.

Turkey is one of five NATO member states which are part of the nuclear sharing policy of the alliance, together with Belgium, Germany, Italy, and the Netherlands. A total of 90 B61 nuclear bombs are hosted at the Incirlik Air Base, 40 of which are allocated for use by the Turkish Air Force in case of a nuclear conflict, but their use requires the approval of NATO.

Equipment

Fighter and reconnaissance aircraft

Turkey is one of only five countries in the world which locally produce the F-16 Fighting Falcon.

In 1984 Turkish Aerospace Industries (TAI) was established and Turkey started to produce fighter aircraft locally under license, including a total of 232 F-16 Fighting Falcon (Block 30/40/50) aircraft for the Turkish Air Force. The air force had previously received 8 F-16s that were purchased directly from the United States, bringing the total number of F-16s received by the air force to 245. In 2007 TAI built 30 F-16 Block 50+ aircraft for the airforce and applied the CCIP modernization program to 117 of its Block 40 and 50 F-16s, bringing them to the Block 50+ configuration. 

Dozens of TAI-built F-16s were also exported to other countries, particularly in the Middle East. A total of 46 TAI-built F-16s have been exported to the Egyptian Air Force under the Peace Vector IV Program (1993–1995), making it TAI's second-largest F-16 customer after the Turkish Air Force. 

On July 11, 2002 Turkey became a Level 3 partner of the F-35 Joint Strike Fighter (JSF) development program, and on January 25, 2007, Turkey officially joined the production phase of the JSF program, agreeing to purchase a total of 116 F-35 Lightning II aircraft (100 F-35A CTOL for the Turkish Air Force and 16 F-35B STOVL for the Turkish Naval Forces).

Turkey placed an initial order for 30 F-35A Lightning IIs, six of which were completed as of 2019 and two more were at the assembly line in 2020. The first four F-35As were delivered to Luke Air Force Base between 21 June 2018 and 5 April 2019 for the training of Turkish pilots.

On 17 July 2019, the U.S. Senate passed a defense spending bill which prevents the Turkish Air Force from obtaining the F-35 stealth fighter aircraft due to the country's acquisition of the S-400 missile system from Russia. As of 2023, the U.S. has not refunded the $1.4 billion payment made by Turkey for purchasing the F-35A fighters.

Turkey is currently developing a national fifth generation fighter aircraft named the TAI TFX, a stealth, twin-engine, all-weather air superiority fighter, in development by Turkish Aerospace Industries (TAI) and BAE Systems as its sub-contractor. The aircraft is planned to replace the F-16s of the Turkish Air Force and to be exported to foreign nations. It was officially announced that the TF-X's prototype will be rolled out on 18 March 2023, and make its first flight by the end of 2023.

Airborne early warning and control (AEW&C) aircraft

A total of four Boeing 737 AEW&C Peace Eagle aircraft (together with ground support systems) were ordered by the Turkish Air Force, with an option for two more aircraft. Turkish Aerospace Industries (TAI) is the primary subcontractor for the Peace Eagle parts production, aircraft modification, assembly and tests. Another subcontractor, HAVELSAN, is responsible for system analysis and software support.

Signed on 23 July 2003, the contract to Boeing valued at US$1.385 billion, which was later reduced by US$59 million because some of the requirements were not met. The down payment to Boeing amounted to US$637 million. The project consists of the delivery of 737-700 airframes, ground radars and control systems, ground control segments for mission crew training, mission support and maintenance support.

Peace Eagle 1 was modified and tested by Boeing Integrated Defense Systems in Seattle, Washington, USA. Peace Eagle 2, 3 and 4 were modified and tested at the facilities of TAI in Ankara, Turkey, with the participation of Boeing and a number of Turkish companies. As of 2006, the four Peace Eagle airplanes were scheduled to be delivered in 2008. As of mid-2007, systems integration was ongoing and airworthiness certification works continued. In September 2007, Boeing completed the first test flight of Turkey's AEW&C 737.

On 4 June 2008, it was announced that Turkish Aerospace Industries completed the first in-country modification of a Boeing 737-700 into an airborne early warning and control (AEW&C) platform for Turkey's Peace Eagle program.

The first Peace Eagle aircraft, named Kuzey (meaning North) was formally accepted into Turkish Air Force inventory on 21 February 2014. The remaining three aircraft will be named Güney (South), Doğu (East) and Batı (West).

The six-year delay was a result of Boeing experiencing difficulties while developing some features required by the Turkish Air Force. Turkey demanded compensation of US$183 million from Boeing for the delay. The payment of the penalty is requested in the form of increased start-up support period from an initially planned two years to five years, as well as three years of software maintenance service and around US$32 million in spare parts.

Aerial refueling tanker aircraft

In 1994 the Turkish Air Force signed a deal to lease two and purchase seven Boeing KC-135R Stratotanker aerial refueling tanker aircraft. Following the arrival of all seven purchased aircraft, the two leased KC-135Rs were returned to the United States. 

All seven KC-135R Stratotanker aircraft of the Turkish Air Force have received the Pacer CRAG (Compass, Radar And GPS) upgrade. 

The KC-135R-CRAG Stratotanker aerial refueling tanker aircraft of the Turkish Air Force are operated by the 101st Squadron, stationed at the Incirlik Air Base.

Although the Airbus A400M Atlas is essentially a heavy tactical lift aircraft, it can also be transformed into an aerial refueling tanker aircraft at short notice.

Military transport aircraft 

Turkey is a partner nation in the Airbus A400M Atlas production program. 

The Turkish Air Force has ordered a total of ten A400M Atlas aircraft. The first two A400M Atlas were delivered to the Turkish Air Force in 2014. All A400M Atlas deliveries to the Turkish Air Force were completed by 2018. 

Turkish Aerospace Industries (TAI) produces several components of the A400M Atlas, including the middle-front fuselage, emergency exit doors, rear fuselage upper panels, rear upper escape doors, ailerons and spoilers; which are sent to the Airbus Military factory in Spain for assembly.

The Turkish Air Force also uses the C-130 Hercules, C-160 Transall and CASA CN-235 military transport aircraft. 

The transport helicopters used by the Turkish Armed Forces include the Boeing CH-47 Chinook, Sikorsky S-70 Black Hawk and Eurocopter AS532 Cougar.

Unmanned aerial vehicles (UAVs)

At present, the Turkish Air Force operates HALE UCAVs such as the Baykar Akıncı, and MALE UCAVs such as the TAI Aksungur, TAI Anka, Bayraktar TB2 and the IAI Heron. The jet-engined UCAV Baykar Kızılelma is currently being developed for the Turkish Air Force and Turkish Naval Forces; its maiden flight was successfully completed on December 14, 2022. Having been unable to purchase the armed version of Predator UCAVs from the United States, Turkey has fitted these drones with indigenous MAM series munitions, while the Baykar Akıncı HALE UCAV can also be armed with the SOM cruise missile. Turkish Armed Forces currently stands as one of the top countries that uses UCAVs in combat effectively. TAI was once the leading partner in the Talarion UCAV project of EADS.

Satellites
The Turkish Air Force currently operates the military intelligence satellites Göktürk-1, Göktürk-2 and Türksat 5A, while Göktürk-3 is scheduled to be launched in 2023. Göktürk-1 is a 0.8m resolution reconnaissance satellite for use by the Turkish Armed Forces, launched in 2016; and Göktürk-2 is a 2m resolution reconnaissance satellite for use by the National Intelligence Organization, launched in 2012. Some electro-optical parts that were required for the Göktürk-1 (0.8m resolution) satellite were beyond TAI's technological know-how, thus a foreign partner was sought. The official bidders for the project were EADS Astrium (U.K.), OHB-System (Germany) and Telespazio (Italy); and the contract was won by Telespazio of Italy.

Göktürk-2 was launched from the Jiuquan Launch Area 4 / SLS-2 in China by a Long March 2D space launch vehicle at 16:12:52 UTC on December 18, 2012. The first signal from Göktürk-2 was received at 17:39 UTC by the Tromsø Satellite Station, northern Norway.

Göktürk-1 was launched later, after numerous delays due to political and business disputes, at 13:51:44 UTC on December 5, 2016, from the Guiana Space Center, on Vega flight VV08 of the European Space Agency's Vega rocket.

In 2013 Turkey approved the construction by Roketsan of its first satellite launching center, initially for low earth orbit satellites.

In 2015, Turkey and Ukraine signed a space program cooperation agreement worth billions of dollars.

Türksat 5A was launched on January 8, 2021, at 02:15:00 UTC from Cape Canaveral (CCSFS), SLC-40. It greatly extended the range of drone operations from the west of Europe to the east of Kazakhstan, with more resistance against jamming, rejection and wiretapping; high-definition live streams of targets and commanding of munitions drops.

Formation and structure
 

For a long period, the combat units of the Turkish Air Force were organized into a 1st Air Force (deployed in the western part of the country and headquartered in Eskişehir) and a 2nd Air Force (deployed in the eastern part of the country and headquartered in Diyarbakır). On August 5, 2014, the two have been fused into the newly formed Combatant Air Force and Air Defence Command with headquarters in Eskişehir. Due to its involvement in the coup d'état attempt on July 15, 2016, the 4th Main Jet Air Base Command near Ankara was disbanded and its F-16s were dispersed to other bases.

Air Force Command HQ (Hava Kuvvetleri Komutanlığı Karargâhı) (Ankara) 

 Combatant Air Force and Air Missile Defense Command (Muharip Hava Kuvveti ve Hava Füze Savunma Komutanlığı) (Eskişehir)
 1st Main Jet Base Command (1. Ana Jet Üs Komutanlığı) (Eskişehir)
 111th Squadron "Panther" (111. Filo "Panter") - F-4E 2020T Terminator (last operational F-4 unit)
 112th Squadron "Devil" (112. Filo "Şeytan") (temporarily disbanded in anticipation of F-35As)
 113th Squadron "Gazelle" (113. Filo "Ceylan") - F-16C/D Block 30/50 Fighting Falcon  (SNIPER and DB.110 recon pods-specialised. The former 113th Squadron "Light" ("Işık") flying RF-4E has been disbanded in 2014, but the disbandment of the 4th Main Jet Base in Ankara-Akıncı has resulted in the relocation and rebadging of its reconnaissance 142nd Squadron "Gazelle" (142. Filo Ceylan) to Eskişehir)
 401st Test Squadron (401. Test Filosu) - F-16C/D Block 30/40, F-4E 2020 (weapons testing and evaluation squadron, took over this role from the 132nd Squadron)
 201st Liaison and SAR Squadron "Attack" (201. İrtibat ve Arama-Kurtarma Filosu "Atak") - CN-235M-100, AS-532UL Mk.1
 3rd Main Jet Base Command (3. Ana Jet Üs Komutanlığı) (Konya)
 131st Squadron "Dragon" (131. Filo "Ejder") - B-737-7ES AEW&C (AEW squadron)
 132nd Squadron "Dagger" (132. Filo "Hançer") - F-16C/D Block 50 Fighting Falcon (in 2014 the unit has been designated as a weapons and tactics training squadron. However, after the 2016 restructuring of the TuAF units this might has changed, as the Turkish DHA news agency has reported, that 12 F-16s of the squadron have participated in bombing missions in Northern Syria as part of Operation Olive Branch in January 2018.)
 133rd Aerobatic Squadron "Turkish Stars" (133. Akrotim Filo "Türk Yıldızları") - NF-5A/B 2000 Freedom Fighter
 135th Liaison and SAR Squadron "Fire" (135. İrtibat ve Arama-Kurtarma Filosu "Ateş") - AS-532UL Mk.1+
 5th Main Jet Base Command (5. Ana Jet Üs Komutanlığı) (Merzifon)
 151st Squadron "Bronze" (151. Filo "Tunç") - F-16C/D Block 40/50 Fighting Falcon (HARM-specialised)
 152nd Squadron "Raider" (152. Filo "Akıncı") - F-16C/D Block 40 Fighting Falcon (relocated to Incirlik Air Base to free facilities at Merzifon for the relocation of 4th Main Jet Base's 143rd Squadron from Ankara-Akıncı, but retained as part of 5th Main Jet Base Command)
 153rd Squadron "Forefather" (153. Filo "Öncel") - F-16C/D Block 30/40 Fighting Falcon (F-16 OCU, the former 4th Main Jet Base's (in Ankara-Akıncı) 143rd Squadron in the OCU role, relocated to Merzifon and rebadged as the 153rd.)
 5th Main Jet Base Command SAR Flight "Angel" (5. Ana Jet Üs Komutanlığı Arama-Kurtarma Kolu "Melek") - AS-532UL Mk.1+
 6th Main Jet Base Command (6. Ana Jet Üs Komutanlığı) (Bandırma)
 161st Squadron "Bat" (161. Filo "Yarasa") - F-16C/D Block 40/50+ Fighting Falcon (LANTIRN-specialised)
 162nd Squadron "Harpoon" (162. Filo "Zıpkın") - F-16C/D Block 40 Fighting Falcon
 6th Main Jet Base Command SAR Flight (6. Ana Jet Üs Komutanlığı Arama-Kurtarma Kolu) - AS-532UL Mk.1+
 7th Main Jet Base Command (7. Ana Jet Üs Komutanlığı) (Malatya-Erhaç)
 171st Squadron "Corsair" (171. Filo "Korsan") (temporarily disbanded, to convert to F-35A)
 172nd Squadron "Hawk" (172. Filo "Şahin") (temporarily disbanded, to convert to F-35A)
 173rd Squadron "Dawn" (173. Filo "Şafak") (recon squadron, RF-4E/TM(G) phased out of service, to operate armed TAI Anka UAVs)
 7th Main Jet Base Command SAR Flight "Burak" (7. Ana Jet Üs Komutanlığı Arama-Kurtarma Kolu "Burak") - AS-532UL Mk.1+
 8th Main Jet Base Group Command (8. Ana Jet Üs Komutanlığı) (Diyarbakır)
 181st Squadron "Leopard" (181. Filo "Pars") - F-16C/D Block 40TM/Block 50+ Fighting Falcon (LANTIRN-specialised)
 182nd Squadron "Accipiter" (182. Filo "Atmaca") - F-16C/D Block 40 Fighting Falcon
 202nd Liaison and SAR Squadron "East" (202. İrtibat ve Arama-Kurtarma Filosu "Şark") - CN-235M-100, AS-532UL Mk.1+
 9th Main Jet Base Command (9. Ana Jet Üs Komutanlığı) (Balıkesir)
 191st Squadron "Cobra" (191. Filo "Kobra") - F-16C/D Block 50 Fighting Falcon
 192nd Squadron "Tiger" (192. Filo "Kaplan") - F-16C/D Block 50+ Fighting Falcon
 9th Main Jet Base Command SAR Flight (9. Ana Jet Üs Komutanlığı Arama-Kurtarma Kolu) - AS-532UL Cougar Mk.1+
 10th Tanker Base Command (10. Tanker Üs Komutanlığı) (Incirlik)
 101st Tanker Squadron "Asena" (101. Tanker Filosu "Asena") - KC-135R Stratotanker
 14th UAV Systems Base Command (14. İnsansız Uçak Sistemleri Üs Komutanlığı) (Batman)
 TAI Anka, IAI Heron, Karayel, Harpy, I-GNAT ER
 Air Defence Command (Hava Savunma Komutanlığı)
 15th Missile Base Command (15. Füze Üs Komutanlığı) (Alemdağ-Istanbul)
S400 Group Command (S400 Grup Komutanlığı) (Akıncı-Ankara)
15th Missile Base Command (15. Füze Üs Komutanlığı) (Alemdağ-Istanbul)
xxth Missile Base Command (xx. Füze Üs Komutanlığı) (Birecik-Şanlıurfa)
one more base will be established possibly in Anamur-Mersin
 9 x Aerial Surveillance Radar Post Commands (Ahlatlıbel-Ankara; Körfez-Kocaeli; Karabelen-Izmir; Çanakkale; Erzurum; Datça-Muğla; Ayancık-Sinop; İskenderun-Hatay; Rize)
 13 x Airfield Commands (reserve air bases) (Akhisar, Antalya, Batman, Dalaman, Erzurum, Afyon, Çorlu, Muş, Ağrı, Sivas, Sivrihisar, Van, Yalova)
 Air Training Command (Hava Eğitim Komutanlığı) (İzmir)
 2nd Main Jet Base Command (2. Ana Jet Üs Komutanlığı) (Çiğli-İzmir)
 121st Squadron "Bee" (121. Filo "Arı") - T-38A Talon (advanced flying training)
 122nd Squadron "Scorpion" (122. Filo "Akrep") - KT-1T (basic flying training)
 123rd Squadron "Chick" (123. Filo "Palaz") - SF-260D ((initial flying training)
 124th Squadron "Pioneer" (124. Filo "Öncü") (borrows a/c from the other squadrons) (instructor training, standartidation and instrumental flying training)
 125th Squadron "Panther" (125. Filo "Panter") - CN-235M-100, UH-1H Iroquois (transport and helicopter training)
 Air Training Command Liaison Squadron (Hava Eğitim Komutanlığı İrtibat Filosu) (İzmir-Adnan Menderes Airport)
 203rd SAR Squadron "Aegean" (203. Arama Kurtarma Filosu "Ege") - CN-235M-100
 Air Warfare School (Hava Harp Okulu, the Air Force academy) (Yeşilköy-Istanbul)
 Training Corps (Eğitim Kıtaatı)
 Sparrow Flight (Serçe Kol) - T-41D Mescalero
 Search and Rescue Flight (Arama-Kurtarma Kolu) - UH-1H Iroquois
 Yalova Glider Camp (Yalova Planör Kampı) - SZD-50-3
 Air Force Technical Schools Command (Hava Teknik Okullar Komutanlığı) (Gaziemir Air Base, İzmir)
 Air Force NCO Schools Command (Hava Sınıf Okulları Komutanlığı) (Gaziemir Air Base, İzmir)
 Air Force Basic Training Brigade Command (Hava Er Eğitim Tugay Komutanlığı) (Kütahya)
 Air Logistical Command (Hava Lojistik Komutanlığı) (Etimesgut-Ankara)
 11th Air Transportation Main Base Command (11. Hava Ulaştırma Ana Üs Komutanlığı) (Etimesgut-Ankara)
 211th Squadron "Globetrotter" (211.Filo "Gezgin") - various CN-235 variants, including ELINT, EW, MedEvac and VIP
 212th Special Squadron "Eagle" (212. Özel Filo "Doğan") - A330, A319, Ce. 550/ Ce.560, Ce.650, G.IV-SP - government and high command executive fleet
 12th Air Transportation Main Base Command (12. Hava Ulaştırma Ana Üs Komutanlığı) (Erkilet-Kayseri)
 221st Squadron "Breeze" (221. Filo "Esen") - A-400M, C-160D)
 222nd Squadron "Flame" (222.Filo "Alev") - C-130B/E)
 1st Air Supply and Maintenance Center Command (1. Hava İkmal Bakım Merkezi Komutanlığı) (Eskişehir)
 2nd Air Supply and Maintenance Center Command (2. Hava İkmal Bakım Merkezi Komutanlığı) (Kayseri)
 3rd Air Supply and Maintenance Center Command (3. Hava İkmal Bakım Merkezi Komutanlığı) (Ankara)
 Military Air Traffic Control Command (Hava Malzeme Transit Komutanlığı) (Istanbul)
 Air Museum Command (Hava Kuvvetleri Müzesi) (Istanbul)

Squadrons
The above commands consist of:
 19 Combat squadrons
 1 Reconnaissance squadron
 6 Training squadrons
 6 Transportation squadrons
 1 Tanker squadron
 8 Surface-to-air missile (SAM) squadrons

Insignia

 OF3, OF2, & OR2 translate to "Head of 1000", "Head of 100", and "Head of 10" respectively.

Future of the Turkish Air Force

In 2008, HAVELSAN of Turkey and Boeing of the United States were in the process of developing a next generation, high-altitude ballistic missile defence shield. It was envisaged that the system would be used by Turkey, the U.S. and other NATO members.

In 2011, Turkey's Undersecretariat for Defense Industries (SSM), signed an agreement with TAI for the conceptual development of basic capabilities of a national fifth generation fighter aircraft project named the TAI TF-X On June 30, 2021, the Turkish Air Force made an official presentation about the TF-X program to the press.

On 28 March 2013, the Turkish Secretary of the Defence Industry of the Ministry of National Defence of Turkey Murat Bayar announced intentions to replace the F-16 fighter with domestically produced multi-role fighters by 2023.

Following the agreement signed on 22 July 2018 between the Turkish Air Force and TAI, the program for developing an advanced jet trainer, TAI Hürjet, was initiated to replace the existing T-38 Talon aircraft. The Hürjet is expected to be operational by 2025.

The CEO of the UAV-giant in Turkey, Baykar, announced that Turkey is developing an unmanned fighter jet and bomber, the Baykar Kızılelma (MIUS). The fighter is expected to make its first flight in 2023.

Timeline of battles and operations

 Balkan Wars (1912–1913)
 World War I (1914–1918)
 Turkish War of Independence (1919–1922)
 Ararat rebellion (1930)
 Dersim rebellion (1937–1938)
 Korean War (1950–1953)
 Battle of Tillyria (1964)
 Turkish invasion of Cyprus (1974)
 Operations against the PKK (1984–Present)
 Operation Provide Comfort (1991)
 Operation Deliberate Force (1995)
 Operation Northern Watch (1997–2003)
 Operation Allied Force (1999)
 Operation Enduring Freedom (2001–2014)
 Operation Northern Iraq (2008)
 Operation Sun (2008)
 Cross-border raids in Iraq (2011)
 Operation Martyr Yalçın (2015)
 Turkey–ISIL conflict (2013–Present)
 Operation Euphrates Shield (2016–2017)
 Operation Olive Branch (2018–2019)
 Operation Peace Spring (2019)
 Turkish intervention in Libya (2020)
 Operation Spring Shield (2020)
 Operation Claw Sword (2022)

See also

 Turkish Stars
 List of Commanders of the Turkish Air Force
 List of Chiefs of the Turkish General Staff
Turkish Aeronautical Association

Notes

References

Bibliography

External links
 
 Official Turkish Armed Forces Website
 Official Turkish Air Force Website
 Istanbul Technical University Faculty of Aeronautics and Astronautics

 
Aviation in Turkey
Air forces by country